Peter Poon Wing-cheung, OBE, LLD, JP (born 1934, Hong Kong) is an accountant and politician. 

After a secondary education at Wah Yan College, Poon studied law at London University and was admitted to The Law Society. He later studied for a legum doctoral degree at the Chinese University of Hong Kong. He is a fellow of both the Australian Society of Accountants and the Hong Kong Society of Accountants and a member of the Singapore Society of Accountants. He is also an authorised company auditor in England and accountant in Australia.

He was an appointed member of the Legislative Council of Hong Kong from 1983 to 1991.

Personal
He is married to Theresa, also an accountant.

References

1934 births
Living people
Officers of the Order of the British Empire
Alumni of the Chinese University of Hong Kong
Alumni of the University of London
Hong Kong accountants
HK LegCo Members 1985–1988
HK LegCo Members 1988–1991